Amica is the Latin word for "friend" in the feminine (i.e., "female friend") and may also refer to:

Businesses and products
 Amica Mutual Insurance, a US-based insurance company
 Hyundai Amica, a city car produced by Hyundai
 Amica (company), a Polish manufacturer of white goods and kitchen equipment

Film, television and theatre
 Amica (opera), an opera by Pietro Mascagni

Sports
 Amica Wronki, a Polish football club
 Amica Chips-Knauf, a former cycling team based in San Marino

Other uses
 Amica (band), an Australian pop group for 6 to 12-year-olds
 Amica (magazine), an Italian fashion magazine
 Bel Amica, a ghost ship
 Amica Temple of Radiance, a new religious movement
 Automatic Musical Instruments Collector's Association

See also
 Amico (disambiguation)
 Amicus (disambiguation)
 Amiga (disambiguation)
 Amigo (disambiguation)